Butrum Creek is a  long 1st order tributary to Lawsons Creek in Halifax County, Virginia.

Course 
Butrum Creek rises about 1 mile west of Cedar Grove, Virginia, and then flows northeast and to join Lawsons Creek about 3 miles northeast of Alton.

Watershed 
Butrum Creek drains  of area, receives about 45.8 in/year of precipitation, has a wetness index of 387.82, and is about 45% forested.

See also 
 List of Virginia Rivers

References

Watershed Maps 

Rivers of Virginia
Rivers of Halifax County, Virginia
Tributaries of the Roanoke River